Miss Grand Nicaragua 2021 was the inaugural edition of the Miss Grand Nicaragua beauty pageant, held at the Teatro Municipal José de la Cruz Mena in León, Nicaragua, on August 8, 2021. Nine candidates from seven country's departments competed for the national titles, with Managua and the North Caribbean Coast each sending two candidates, of whom Epifanía Solís of Managua and Maycrin Jáenz of Granada were named Miss Grand Nicaragua 2021 and Miss Grand Nicaragua 2022, respectively. The contest was organized under the direction of Saul Benítez, a León-based designer who acquired the contest license in 2019.

After the end of the pageant training, Epifanía Solís represented the country at the  pageant held on December 4, 2021, in Thailand, while Maycrin Jáenz later participated in the following edition held on October 25, 2022, in Indonesia, but both of them went unplaced. 

In the 2021 international tournament, however, Epifanía Solís was ranked among the top ten in the Best in Swimsuit category, one of the pageant's sub-contests.

Competition
In the grand final competition held on August 8, the results of all preliminary activities determined the 5 semifinalists. The top 5 then delivered a speech related to the pageant campaign, Stop wars and violence. After which Miss Grand Nicaragua 2021, Miss Grand Nicaragua 2022, and her three runners-up were announced.

The following list is the panel of judges for the grand final competition of the Miss Grand Nicaragua 2021 pageant.
 Nairoby Ramírez
 Arlen Mairena
 Karina Gaitán
 Gabriel Rodríguez

Results summary

Main placements

Special awards

Candidates
9 contestants competed for the titles.

References

External links 

 
Miss Grand Nicaragua
Grand Nicaragua